David Benkof (born David Ari Bianco on October 9, 1970) is an American political commentator who lives in Jerusalem.  He was raised in St. Louis, Missouri and then went to college at Stanford University, where he came out as gay his freshman year.  In 1989 he served as the international president of United Synagogue Youth.

Career 
In 1995, he founded Q Syndicate, a gay-press syndication service that provides columns, cartoons, crossword puzzles and horoscopes to about 100 gay and lesbian newspapers. In 1999 he founded  Press Pass Q, a  monthly e-mail newsletter for  gay and lesbian press professionals.  In 2001, he sold a majority interest in Q Syndicate to Rivendell Marketing, and served as vice president for two years before selling the rest of the company.  In 1997 Benkof wrote Modern Jewish History for Everyone and in 1999 Gay Essentials: Facts for Your Queer Brain.  In 2002 and 2003 he wrote the column "Over the Rainbow" for Q Syndicate.  He also contributes to the Jewish Journal of Los Angeles.

Ideas, influences and human rights campaign 
In 2003, he announced that for religious reasons he had stopped having sex with men.  He had always been a devout Jew, and said that one reason he changed was because "Gay sex is just inconsistent with traditional religious life."  To reflect his change in sexual identity, and to honor his late grandfather, Julius Benkof, he changed his name to David Benkof.  He still identified as a gay man, criticized the Ex-gay movement, and expressed his opinion that "reparative therapy doesn't work".

At that time he was also a strong opponent of same-sex marriage.  In response to arguments for gay marriages, he wrote "This reasoning is not only flawed, it insults the millions of Americans whose traditional faiths call on us to defend marriage as a central institution in society defined as a union between a man and a woman."  He made it clear that his objection to same-sex relationships was based in part on his personal religious beliefs, stating, "I happen to believe that God has been clear to the Jewish people that we should be pursuing opposite-sex relationships, and particularly not having intercourse between two males."

For two months in 2008 he was actively involved in the campaign for California Proposition 8 (2008), and to support this campaign he started a blog called Gays Defend Marriage.  But in July 2008 he broke with the campaign and closed the blog, writing that while  he continued to oppose same-sex marriage he had lost respect for its organizers, and accusing them of tolerating antisemitism and homophobia.

In 2014, Benkof wrote an op-ed piece in the Times Of Israel called Orthodox, celibate, gay and that's OK in which he dismissed arguments in favor of reinterpreting the Biblical prohibition on homosexuality. He stated his "message for Orthodox gays": "For men like us, following Jewish law about sexuality is an enormous struggle which often takes place without much sympathy or support. God loves us even when we cannot understand why He would limit our sexual options. Ideally, we'll never have any sort of intimate contact with other men. But any exceptions should be as infrequent as possible, with as few halachic violations as possible. Be especially careful to avoid mishkav zachar. The process of teshuvah exists precisely so people in such situations can pick themselves up, rectify their behavior, and move on. Take advantage of it."

In 2016 he wrote on Facebook that while he continued to belong to an Orthodox synagogue he no longer believed in Orthodox theology and that he no longer wished to be described as celibate, "or any other bedroom status".  And in 2021 he wrote "I’m openly gay, I date men, and I have no problem with gay marriage - and that’s been true for several years."

Education 
Benkof spent the 2004-2005 year at Darche Noam/Shapell's, an Orthodox yeshiva in Jerusalem.  He then studied at the Hebrew University in Jerusalem during the 2005-2006 academic year.  From 2006-2008 David pursued graduate work in American Jewish history at New York University. In 2008 and 2009 he wrote a weekly column, Fabulously Observant, for The Jerusalem Post and several other Jewish newspapers, discussing "life from the perspective of an Orthodox, conservative, openly gay American Jew in the process of making aliyah".  He returned to Darche Noam/Shapell's from 2011 to 2014 as a teacher of Hebrew grammar.

See also
 Homosexuality and Judaism

Notes

External links
 Benkof's Youtube channel
  Q Syndicate
 Gays Defend Marriage
 

1970 births
Living people
American LGBT businesspeople
American LGBT journalists
American gay men
LGBT Orthodox Jews
LGBT people from Missouri
American Orthodox Jews
Baalei teshuva
American political journalists
Crossword compilers
Stanford University alumni
Gay Jews
Gay businessmen
Gay journalists
Jewish historians
New York University alumni
Hebrew University of Jerusalem alumni
21st-century American LGBT people